Nedelja may refer to:

Mala Nedelja, a small settlement in the eastern part of the Slovene Hills in the Municipality of Ljutomer in northeastern Slovenia
Sveta Nedelja, Istria, a municipality of twenty villages in Istria county, Croatia
Sveta Nedelja, Zagreb county, a town in Zagreb county, Croatia
Velika Nedelja, a settlement in the Municipality of Ormož in northeastern Slovenia

See also
Nedelja na Duhove, the only album by the Serbian rock supergroup Dobrovoljno Pevačko Društvo